Peso fuerte may refer to:
 Argentine peso fuerte, convertible currency used by Argentina from 1826 to 1881 alongside the peso papel
 Ecuadoran peso fuerte, 1846–1856
 Philippine peso fuerte, currency of the Spanish East Indies during the later Spanish colonial period
 Uruguayan peso fuerte, used from 1856 to 1863
 Venezuelan peso fuerte, 1830–1848